The 1988–89 Arkansas Razorbacks men's basketball team represented the University of Arkansas as a member of the Southwest Conference during the 1988–89 college basketball season. The team was led by fourth-year head coach Nolan Richardson, and played its home games in Barnhill Arena in Fayetteville, Arkansas. This Razorbacks team won the first of three straight SWC regular season and conference tournament championships before moving to the Southeastern Conference for the 1991-92 season. After earning the conference's automatic bid to the NCAA tournament, Arkansas defeated Loyola Marymount in the opening round before losing to Louisville in the second round.

Roster 
A very strong recruiting class, highlighted by 1988 McDonald's All-Americans Todd Day and Lee Mayberry, and that included Oliver Miller, formed the team's nucleus.

Schedule and results

|-
!colspan=12 style=| Exhibition

|-
!colspan=9 style=| Regular season

|-
!colspan=12 style=|  SWC Tournament

|-
!colspan=12 style=|  NCAA Tournament

Sources

Rankings

Awards and honors
Nolan Richardson – SWC Coach of the Year

References

Arkansas
Arkansas
Arkansas Razorbacks men's basketball seasons
Razor
Razor